This is a list of finalists for the 1966 Archibald Prize for portraiture, listed by Artist and Title. As the images are copyright, an external link to an image has been listed where available.

See also 

 Previous year: List of Archibald Prize 1965 finalists
 Next year: List of Archibald Prize 1967 finalists
 List of Archibald Prize winners
 Lists of Archibald Prize finalists

References 

1966
Archibald Prize
Archibald Prize
Archibald Prize 1966
Archibald Prize 1966